The 2021 Karaliaus Mindaugo taurė, also known as Citadele Karaliaus Mindaugo taurė for sponsorship purposes, was the sixth edition of the Lithuanian King Mindaugas Cup.

Žalgiris were the defending champions. Žalgiris successfully defended its title after beating BC Lietkabelis in the Final.

Format
The top four placed teams from the LKL 2019–20 season, gained an automatic bye to the 2021 Karaliaus Mindaugo taurė quarterfinals. While the six lower placed teams from the 2019–20 LKL  season along with six other NKL teams, playing in first round, competing for the other four quarterfinals places.

Draw
The first round draw of the 2021 Karaliaus Mindaugo taurė, was held on 23 September 2020. LKL teams were paired with the NKL teams. The drawing ceremony was held in half time of BC Žalgiris against BC Dzūkija in LKL TV studio. Brothers Kšyštof Lavrinovič and Darjuš Lavrinovič were guests who helped to draw pairs.

Qualified teams

Notable events 
 On 12 October 2020, LKL announced that due to the confirmed coronavirus in the Neptūnas-Akvaservis the 13 October 2020 match between Neptūnas-Akvaservis and Šiauliai have been postponed.
 On 19 October 2020, the 20 October 2020 match between Neptūnas-Akvaservis and Šiauliai have been postponed one more time.
 On 20 October 2020, Juventus defeated their opponents Sūduva-Mantinga and entered King Mindaugas Cup quarter-finals.
 On 27 October 2020, due to confirmed coronavirus in NKL league team, against which Šilutė played, the match between Alytus Dzūkija and Šilutė is postponed to November 3, 2020.
 On 27 October 2020, Cbet Prienai after winning against their opponents Žalgiris-2 enters King Mindaugas Cup quarter-finals.
 On 27 October 2020 Nevėžis-OPTIBET, after winning against their opponents, enters second round of the King Mindaugas Cup.
 On 12 November 2020, after the draw ceremony of the second round of the King Mindaugas Cup, it became clear which teams would have to compete for their place in the quarterfinals.
 On 1 December 2020, Šiauliai enters the second stage of the King Mindaugas Cup after defeating their opponents Neptūnas-Akvaservis.
 On 3 December 2020, Pieno žvaigždės after defeating their opponents Nevėžis-OPTIBET, enters King Mindaugas Cup quarter–finals.
 On 6 December 2020, the draw ceremony of the King Mindaugas Cup quarter-finals took place.
 On 5 January 2021, after the victory over Alytaus Dzūkija, Šiauliai enters the King Mindaugas Cup quarter–finals.
 On 16 January 2021, Juventus Utena advance to the King Mindaugas Cup final four after a series of 2-0 against Rytas Vilnius.
 On 16 January 2021, Lietkabelis Panevėžys advance to the King Mindaugas Cup final four after a series of 2-0 against Cbet Prienai.
 On 17 January 2021, Neptūnas Klaipėda advance to the King Mindaugas Cup final four after a series of 1-1 (91–76, 77–88) against Šiauliai.
 On 18 January 2021, Žalgiris Kaunas advance to the King Mindaugas Cup final four after a series of 2–0 against Pieno žvaigždės Pasvalys.
 On 13 February 2021, Lietkabelis Panevėžys enters to the King Mindaugas Cup finals after winning the semifinals against Juventus Utena with the result 84-73. Žalgiris Kaunas also enters to the King Mindaugas Cup finals after winning the semifinals against Neptūnas Klaipėda with the result 84–72
 On 14 February 2021, Juventus Utena finishes the King Mindaugas Cup by winning against Neptūnas Klaipėda 86-69 and winning third place.
 On 14 February 2021, a three-point contest was held and the contest won Rytas player Andrew Goudelock.
 On 14 February 2021, Žalgiris Kaunas defended its King Mindaugas Cup title and became the 2021 King Mindaugas Cup champions. This is the fourth King Mindaugas Cup title of Žalgiris Kaunas.

First round 
Two best first round pairs winners, who had the highest position in table last season, gained an automatic bye to the quarterfinals. Rest four teams, who won in first round, play in second round. Four teams will be paired by draw and will be playing two games home and away.

Round 1

Round 2

Second round 
From each pair, the team with the best difference between the points scored and missed in both matches will advance to the quarterfinals. If, at the end of the second match, the total difference between the points scored and missed by both teams is equal, then an overtime or as many overtime will have to be played until the winner of the pair is determined.

Bracket

Quarter–finals

Šiauliai vs. Neptūnas Klaipėda

CBet Prienai vs. Lietkabelis Panevėžys

Pieno žvaigždės Pasvalys vs. Žalgiris Kaunas

Juventus Utena vs. Rytas Vilnius

Semi–finals

Juventus Utena vs. Lietkabelis Panevėžys

Žalgiris Kaunas vs. Neptūnas Klaipėda

Third place game

Final

Three-Point contest

 Domantas Vilys was selected as Justas Tamulis replacement.

References

External links 
 Karaliaus Mindaugo taurė website

Karaliaus Mindaugo taurė
Karaliaus Mindaugo taurė